Hubertus von Bonin (3 August 1911 – 15 December 1943) was a German Luftwaffe military aviator during the Spanish Civil War and World War II, a fighter ace listed with 77 enemy aircraft shot down. He claimed four victories in the Spanish Civil War, and during World War II, 64 on the Eastern Front and nine on the Western Front.

Born in Potsdam, von Bonin volunteered for service with the Condor Legion during the Spanish Civil War where he commanded the 3. Staffel (3rd squadron) of Jagdgruppe 88 (J/88—88th Fighter Group). Following service in Spain, von Bonin was posted to Jagdgeschwader 26 "Schlageter" (JG 26—26th Fighter Wing). In January 1940, he was appointed Gruppenkommandeur (group commander) of I. Gruppe (1st group) of Jagdgeschwader 54 (JG 51—51st Fighter Wing). He then served as a flight instructor before taking command of III. Gruppe of Jagdgeschwader 52 (JG 52—52nd Fighter Wing) on the Eastern Front. Von Bonin was awarded the Knight's Cross of the Iron Cross on 17 November 1942 after 51 aerial victories claimed. In July 1943, he was appointed Geschwaderkommodore (wing commander) of JG 54. Von Bonin was killed in action in aerial combat on 15 December 1943 near Haradok.

Early life and career
Von Bonin was born on 3 August 1911 in Potsdam in the Province of Brandenburg of the German Empire. He was the son of Bogislaw von Bonin and his wife Mathilde, a daughter of Adolf von Bülow. His older brother, Bogislaw served in the Army and later in the Amt Blank, a predecessor of the Federal Ministry of Defence. His two younger brothers also served in the Luftwaffe, Jürgen-Oskar was killed in action on 8 February 1942 while serving as an observer in a Tansportgeschwader (air transport wing). Another brother, Eckart-Wilhelm, became a night fighter pilot with 37 aerial victories who survived the war.

In October 1932, von Bonin attended the Military School Dresden. Among his classmates were Werner Mölders, Günther Freiherr von Maltzahn, Joachim Pötter, Hans-Henning Freiherr von Beust, Arved Crüger, Gerhard Kollewe and Wolfgang Schellmann. On 15 March 1937, I. Gruppe (1st group) of Jagdgeschwader 334 (JG 334—334th Fighter Wing) was created at Wiesbaden-Erbenheim Airfield and headed by Hauptmann Hubert Merhart von Bernegg. Initially, the Gruppe was created without 3. Staffel (3rd squadron) which was formed on 1 July and placed under the command of von Bonin. The Gruppe was equipped with the Arado Ar 68 E. In early 1938, they received the then new Messerschmitt Bf 109 D-1.

Von Bonin transferred to the Condor Legion on 30 November 1938 and command of 3. Staffel then passed on to Hauptmann Lothar von Jansen. Von Bonin replaced Hauptmann Mölders, his former classmate at the Military School Dresden, as Staffelkapitän (Squadron Leader) of the 3. Staffel of Jagdgruppe 88 (J/88—88th Fighter Group) on 5 December 1938. During the course of the Spanish Civil War, he claimed four Republican fighter aircraft shot down, including a Curtiss P-36 Hawk on 6 March which was J/88's 314th and last aerial victory. For his service in Spain, he was awarded the Spanish Cross in Gold with Swords on 14 April 1939.

After his return from Spain, von Bonin took command of the 5. Staffel of Jagdgeschwader 26 "Schlageter" (JG 26—26th Fighter Wing) on 28 June 1939. He took over command from Hauptmann Herwig Knüppel who was given command of II. Gruppe of JG 26 to which 5. Staffel was subordinated. At the time, II. Gruppe was based at Düsseldorf Airfield and was equipped with the Bf 109 E-1. On 25 August, a week before the outbreak of World War II, the Gruppe was ordered to Bönninghardt, an airfield southwest of Wesel, close to Germany's western border.

World War II
World War II in Europe began on Friday 1 September 1939 when German forces invaded Poland. Based in Bönninghardt, the Gruppe initially flew fighter protection during the "Phoney War" along the Belgian and Dutch border without claiming any aerial victories. On 1 November, II. Gruppe was ordered to Werl where elements were split off to form the nucleus of the newly created III. Gruppe of JG 26. On 1 January 1940, von Bonin was transferred and appointed Gruppenkommandeur (Group Commander) of the I. Gruppe of Jagdgeschwader 54 (JG 54—54th Fighter Wing). He replaced Major Hans-Jürgen von Cramon-Taubadel who was transferred. On 10 May, German forces launched the attack on France, Belgium, Luxembourg and the Netherlands which became the Battle of France. At the time, I. Gruppe was based at Eutingen im Gäu near Horb am Neckar patrolling the German front along the Upper Rhine and Alsace. According to Mathews and Foreman, von Bonin claimed his first aerial victory of World War II the following day, which was not confirmed. Without seeing much further action, I. Gruppe was ordered to Vitry-en-Artois Airfield on 28 May where they fought in the Battle of Dunkirk. On 5 June, German forced launched Fall Rot (Case Red), the second phase of the conquest of France. I. Gruppe supported the left wing of Army Group B's advance. Two days later, von Bonin shot down two Armée de l'Air (French Air Force) Bloch MB.150 fighters near Pontoise.

On 18 June, I. Gruppe was withdrawn from the combat area of Army Group B and ordered to Châteaudun Airfield before moving to Eindhoven Airfield in the Netherlands on 26 June for a period of rest and equipment overhaul. The following day, a Royal Air Force (RAF) flight of Bristol Blenheim bombers was intercepted, and four bombers were claimed shot down, including three by von Bonin. The Gruppe stayed in Eindhoven until 15 July when they moved to Schiphol Airfield. On 26 July, the unit was ordered closer to the English Channel and was then based at an airfield near Campagne-lès-Guines to participate in Battle of Britain. On 25 August, von Bonin was credited with the destruction of a RAF Supermarine Spitfire fighter. He claimed a further Spitfire and a Hawker Hurricane fighter east of Southend-on-Sea on 5 September while escorting Luftwaffe bombers attacking RAF ground targets. On 23 September, I. Gruppe was withdrawn from the English Channel and ordered to Jever Airfield where the Gruppe was again replenished. At Jever, the Gruppe flew fighter patrols over the German Bight.

On 29 April 1941, von Bonin had a taxiing accident in his Bf 109 (Werknummer 2055—factory number) while based at Wesermünde, present-day part of Bremerhaven. The aircraft sustained 10% damage.

Eastern Front and instructor
Operation Barbarossa, the German invasion of the Soviet Union, began on 22 June 1941. In the fortnight prior, JG 54 had been moved to an airfield in Lindenthal near Rautenberg, East Prussia, present-day Uslowoje in Kaliningrad Oblast. Tasked with supporting Army Group North in its advance through the Baltic states towards Leningrad, the unit began combat operations shortly afterwards. On 30 June, von Bonin was transferred to take command of Jagdfliegerschule 4, the fighter pilot school in Fürth. Command of I. Gruppe passed on to Hauptmann Erich von Selle.

On 1 October 1941, he then took command of the III. Gruppe of Jagdgeschwader 52 (JG 52—52nd Fighter Wing) on the Eastern Front. At the time of his posting to JG 52, III. Gruppe was based at Poltava and supporting the 17th Army in its assault on Kharkov, leading up to the First Battle of Kharkov. Under his leadership, III. Gruppe of JG 52 became the most successful fighter unit of the Luftwaffe. Von Bonin claimed his first aerial victory with JG 52 on 29 April 1942. That day, he shot down a Yakovlev Yak-1 fighter. III. Gruppe had just relocated to Zürichtal, a small village at the Inhul in the former German settlement west of Feodosia in the Crimea. On 12 May, III. Over the next weeks, III. Gruppe was moved several times. On 19 May, the Gruppe moved to Barvinkove where they stayed until 12 June mostly fighting over the encircled Soviet forces in the Izium salient. They were then ordered to Belgorod and to Grakowo, located approximately halfway between Kharkov and Kupiansk, on 22 June. On 26 June, III. Gruppe then moved to Bely Kolodez where they stayed until 3 July. According to Prien, Stemmer, Rodeike and Bock, von Bonin claimed seven aerial victories between 9 May to 30 June which were not documented.

On 28 June, German forces had launched Case Blue, the strategic summer offensive in southern Russia. On 7 July, Army Group A began their advance towards the oil fields in the Caucasus. On 13 August, III. Gruppe had reached Mineralnye Vody in the North Caucasus region. In mid-August, von Bonin was ordered to detach a small Kommando (commando) under the command of Oberleutnant Hermann Graf. On 23 August, von Bonin claimed a Polikarpov I-16 fighter and a Douglas A-20 Havoc, also known as a Boston, taking his total to 19 aerial victories. On 27 August, III. Gruppe reached an airfield named Gonschtakowka located north-northeast of Mozdok on the Terek. There, von Bonin claimed two Lavochkin-Gorbunov-Gudkov LaGG-3 fighters and a Boston bomber shot down on 30 August. On the next two days, he shot down one LaGG-3 fighter on each day taking his total to 24. On 2 September, von Bonin was credited with a Polikarpov I-153 fighter and two Boston bombers.

On 19 September, III. Gruppe reached an airfield named Soldatskaya, west of Mozdok. The Gruppe would remain here until 1 January 1943 but would also use airfields at Mozdok and Digora. He was awarded the German Cross in Gold on 27 October 1942. On 1 November, von Bonin became an "ace-in-a-day" claiming a La-5, a MiG-3, and two LaGG-3 fighters plus an Il-2 ground attack aircraft, taking his total to 46 aerial victories. On 13 December, von Bonin claimed two Yak-1 fighters, his last aerial victories of 1942, taking his total to 56. A week later, on 21 December, von Bonin received the Knight's Cross of the Iron Cross. Von Bonin claimed his next aerial victories in late April 1943. III. Gruppe had been ordered to Taman on the Kuban on 1 April. On 29 April, he shot down two LaGG-3 fighters. His last claim with JG 52 was filed on 29 May when he shot down a LaGG-3 fighter.

Wing commander and death

On 5 July 1943, Oberstleutnant Hannes Trautloft, the Geschwaderkommodore (wing commander) of JG 54, was transferred to the staff of the General der Jagdflieger (General of Fighters), an office held by Generalmajor Adolf Galland. In consequence, von Bonin was transferred and assumed command of JG 54 on 6 July 1943. At the time, the Geschwaderstab (headquarters unit) of JG 54 was based at Siversky and subordinated to Luftflotte 1 (Air Fleet 1), supporting Army Group North. Prior to this posting, von Bonin had just recently married. Further south, German forces had launched Operation Citadel on 5 July, the failed attempt to eliminate the Kursk salient that initiated the Battle of Kursk. In support of this offensive, JG 54 moved to Oryol on 9 July, fighting on the northern pincer of Generaloberst Walter Model's 9th Army.

In October, the Geschwaderstab moved to Vitebsk. On 15 December, von Bonin claimed two Il-2 ground attack aircraft shot down northeast of Gorodok, present-day Haradok. Von Bonin had attacked a flight of six Il-2 ground attack aircraft and their fighter escort. In this encounter, he was shot down and killed in action in his Focke Wulf Fw 190 A-5 (Werknummer 2600) east of Gorodok. Command of JG 54 initially remained vacant until Oberstleutnant Anton Mader was appointed Geschwaderkommodore on 28 January 1944.

Summary of career

Aerial victory claims
According to Spick, von Bonin was credited with 77 aerial victories claimed in an unknown number combat missions. This figure includes four aerial victories during the Spanish Civil War, nine during the Battle of France and Britain and further 64 aerial victories on the Eastern Front. Mathews and Foreman, authors of Luftwaffe Aces — Biographies and Victory Claims, researched the German Federal Archives and found documentation for 65 aerial victory claims. This number includes four claims during the Spanish Civil War, eight over the Western Allies, and 53 on the Eastern Front.

Victory claims were logged to a map-reference (PQ = Planquadrat), for example "PQ 44283". These sectors were then subdivided into 36 smaller units to give a location area 3 × 4 km in size.

Awards
 Spanish Cross in Gold with Swords (14 April 1939)
 Iron Cross (1939) 2nd and 1st class
 German Cross in Gold on 27 October 1942 as Major in the III./Jagdgeschwader 52
 Knight's Cross of the Iron Cross on 21 December 1942 as Major and Gruppenkommandeur of the III./Jagdgeschwader 52

Notes

References

Citations

Bibliography

External links
Hubertus von Bonin @ Ritterkreuzträger 1939–45

1911 births
1943 deaths
Condor Legion personnel
German World War II flying aces
Luftwaffe personnel killed in World War II
People from the Province of Brandenburg
German military personnel of the Spanish Civil War
Recipients of the Gold German Cross
Recipients of the Knight's Cross of the Iron Cross
Aviators killed by being shot down
Military personnel from Potsdam